HMS Mohawk was an  torpedo cruiser of the Royal Navy, built by J. & G. Thompson at Glasgow and launched on 6 February 1886.

Her first service was on the Cape Station between 1890 and 1892. In 1893, Mohawk was serving on the North America and West Indies Station when civil disorder broke out on the island of Dominica. A party of Marines and sailors were landed to assist the local police in stopping the rioting. Four rioters were killed and several injured on both sides, including the commanding officer of Mohawk, Commander Edward Henry Bayley, before order was restored.

Mohawk commenced service on the Australia Station in December 1897. During the Boxer Rebellion in China, she escorted the New South Wales Naval Brigade to Peking before commencing service on the China Station. On 24 April 1901 she was paid off into the Fleet Reserve at Chatham.

She was recommissioned in January 1903 to replace the Scout on the Mediterranean Station, with Commander Ernest Gaunt transferring from that ship to be in command. In April 1904 she saw service during the Somaliland Campaign, including supplying men for the landing party that stormed and captured the forts at Illig. She returned to England in 1905, and on 4 April that year was sold to Garnham for £4,850 for breaking up at Chatham.

Citations

References
Bastock, John (1988), Ships on the Australia Station, Child & Associates Publishing Pty Ltd; Frenchs Forest, Australia. 

 

1886 ships
Ships built on the River Clyde
Archer-class cruisers
Victorian-era naval ships of the United Kingdom